Garra surendranathanii is a species of ray-finned fish in the genus Garra from the Western Ghats in Kerala. It occurs on four river systems the Periyar, Chalakudy, Pamba  and Achenkovil in the state.  A decline in habitat quality has endangered this fish.

References 

Garra
Fish described in 1996